Ed or Eddie Fisher may refer to:

Sports
 Ed Fisher (baseball) (1876–1951), American baseball pitcher in 1902
 Eddie Fisher (baseball) (born 1936), American baseball pitcher in 1960s and '70s
 Ed Fisher (American football) (born 1949), American football player

Others
 Eddie Fisher (drummer) (born 1973), American drummer
 Eddie Fisher (singer) (1928–2010), American singer

See also
 Ed Fischer (disambiguation)
 Edward Fisher (disambiguation)
 Edwin Fisher (disambiguation)